Max Tonetto (born 18 November 1974) is a retired Italian footballer who played as a midfielder. A versatile naturally left-footed player, his preferred position was on the left flank in midfield, although he was often used as a left-back, and could also play as a left wing-back. He played for several Italian clubs throughout his career, most notably Roma, where he won consecutive Coppa Italia titles in 2007 and 2008 during his four seasons with the team.

Club career
Tonetto was born in Trieste. In 2000, Tonetto's career came to a shift when he moved to Lecce, where he became team captain in 2003.

From 2004 to 2006, he enjoyed great success at Serie A side Sampdoria, where he got his first taste of European football in the UEFA Cup. After the end of his contract with Sampdoria, he signed a two-year deal with Roma. He has played more than 300 Serie A games.

In his first season with Roma he showed good performances as a left-back. Although in his thirties, Tonetto is still, despite injuries, able to produce great and outstanding performances.

Tonetto scored his first goal for A.S Roma during a match against Empoli in the 2007–08 season, by completing Francesco Totti's pass and scoring a wonderful goal.

In November 2007, he signed a new contract with Roma which would last until 30 June 2010.

On 11 March 2009, he blasted Roma's eighth and final penalty into the stands in the shootout against Arsenal, which meant Roma were knocked out of the Champions League, failing to progress to the quarter finals.

His contract with Roma expired 30 June 2010, and he subsequently retired from professional football.

International career
Tonetto won his one and only cap for Italy against the Faroe Islands in a qualification match for UEFA Euro 2008.

Honours
Roma
Coppa Italia: 2006–07, 2007–08
Supercoppa Italiana: 2007

References

External links
 

1974 births
Living people
Footballers from Trieste
Association football fullbacks
Italian footballers
Italy international footballers
Alma Juventus Fano 1906 players
A.C. Reggiana 1919 players
Ravenna F.C. players
Empoli F.C. players
A.C. Milan players
Bologna F.C. 1909 players
U.S. Lecce players
U.C. Sampdoria players
A.S. Roma players
Serie A players
Serie B players
Serie C players